The Lure of Jade is a 1921 American silent drama film directed by Colin Campbell and starring Pauline Frederick, Thomas Holding, and Arthur Rankin.

Cast
 Pauline Frederick as Sara Vincent 
 Thomas Holding as Capt. Louis Corey 
 Arthur Rankin as Allan Corey 
 Léon Bary as Stuart Beresford 
 Hardee Kirkland as RAdm. Vincent 
 Lee Shumway as Capt. Willing 
 Clarissa Selwynne as Alida Corey 
 Tôgô Yamamoto as Sara's servant 
 Goro Kino as Willing's servant

References

Bibliography
 Donald W. McCaffrey & Christopher P. Jacobs. Guide to the Silent Years of American Cinema. Greenwood Publishing, 1999.

External links

1921 films
1921 drama films
1920s English-language films
American silent feature films
Silent American drama films
American black-and-white films
Films directed by Colin Campbell
Film Booking Offices of America films
1920s American films